Cyprus competed at the 2014 Winter Olympics in Sochi, Russia from 7 to 23 February 2014. The team of two athletes competing in alpine skiing was unveiled on January 29, 2014.

Competitors

Alpine skiing 

According to the final quota allocation released on January 20, 2014, Cyprus has two athletes in qualification position. Alexandra Taylor had to withdraw from competition, because she sustained a back injury during training.

References

External links 
 
 

Nations at the 2014 Winter Olympics
2014
2014 in Cypriot sport